The Arfak Mountains is a mountain range found on the Bird's Head Peninsula in the Province of West Papua, Indonesia.

The term "arfak" came from the language of the coastal Biak people, meaning "inferior." This is due to how big the mountains are compared to other lowland areas found in this region. Located in the east and central regions of the Bird's Head Peninsula, these mountains rise steeply from the sea, with little or no coastal plain surrounding them.

Since Dutch colonial times the range has been one of the most frequently explored and best known regions of West Papua for bird watching. Along with the Tamrau Mountains in the north, the two ranges have been divided by the grassy Kebar Valley, which is the heartland of many indigenous people, with a variety of backgrounds. Found near the town of Manokwari, the mountains are an important and threatened site of biodiversity, part of the Vogelkop montane rain forests ecoregion. Multiple tribes of indigenous peoples, many who speak mutually unintelligible languages such as Hatam, Meyah and Sougb all call the Arfak Mountains their home. They ultimately are the guardians of the future of the exquisite, yet increasingly threatened bird species found throughout this rugged region.

References

Arfak Mountains: Birding Hotspot of West Papua Accessed 5 March 2015
WWF Bird Watching on Bird's Head, and the Threats to the Region Vogelkop Montane Rain Forests. Accessed 11 September 2006

Mountain ranges of Western New Guinea
Landforms of West Papua (province)